is a monthly Japanese  manga magazine published by Akita Shoten on the third of each month. First issued in December 1986, it is aimed at adult women and tends to feature stories on child-rearing and families. A spin-off magazine, For Mrs. Special, launched in August 1994 and is published quarterly by Akita Shoten.

Serializations

  by Kimiko Uehara (1991–present)
 With the Light: Raising an Autistic Child by Keiko Tobe (2000–2010)

Circulation
For Mrs. had a circulation of 150,000 from 1 October 2009 to 30 September 2010.

References

External links
  at Akita Shoten 
  at Akita Shoten 

1986 establishments in Japan
Akita Shoten magazines
Josei manga magazines
Magazines established in 1986
Magazines published in Tokyo
Monthly manga magazines published in Japan
Women's magazines published in Japan